Harrison Andreas Panayiotou (Greek: Χάρρισον Ανδρέας Παναγιώτου; born 28 October 1994) is a professional footballer who plays as a forward for  club Maidenhead United, on loan from  club Aldershot Town. He represents the Saint Kitts and Nevis national team.

Born in Leicester, Panayiotou joined his hometown club Leicester City as a youngster, making his first-team debut in April 2012. After loan spells at Port Vale in October 2014 and Raith Rovers in the second half of the 2015–16 season, he was released by Leicester. He joined Barrow in September 2016, and was loaned out to Salford City in March 2017. He signed with Nuneaton Borough in June 2018, before moving on to Greek side Aittitos Spata in January 2019 and then returned to the English National League with Aldershot Town in July 2019. After two seasons there, Panayiotou joined Scottish Premiership side Livingston for a short spell, but returned to Aldershot Town in January 2022. He joined Maidenhead United on loan in February 2023.

Panayiotou represents Saint Kitts and Nevis at international level, having made his international debut in 2014.

Club career

Leicester City
Panayiotou was born in Leicester, to a Greek Cypriot father, Andreas, who was involved in youth football, and a Kittian mother. He started his career at the youth academy of local club Leicester City, alongside subsequent first-team teammates Andy King, Jeffrey Schlupp, Liam Moore, Tom Parkes and Cian Bolger. His performances for the under-18 side earned him the Fans' Academy Player of the Year award for the 2011–12 season. He was part of the youth squad which won the HKFC Soccer Sevens cup in May 2013, where he scored five goals, including one in the 2–0 win over Newcastle United in the final; he was subsequently named Player of the Tournament.

After impressing in games for Leicester City Under-21 he was named as the under-21 Premier League Player of the Month for March. On 18 May 2015, Panayiotou was named Leicester City Under-21 Player of the Year, reward for an impressive season including scoring 11 goals in his last 13 games. He made his senior debut for the "Foxes" against Leeds United on the final day of the 2011–12 season at Elland Road; he replaced Lloyd Dyer in the 73rd minute and scored the winning goal in added time. He signed his first professional contract in September 2012, and in July 2014 he extended it by a further two years. On 20 October 2014, Panayioutou joined League One side Port Vale on a one-month loan. However, he did not make a first team appearance for the "Valiants" during his time at Vale Park.

On 29 January 2016, Panayiotou joined Scottish Championship club Raith Rovers on a loan until the end of the 2015–16 season. He made his league debut for Raith against Rangers on 2 February, coming on as a second-half substitute. He scored his first goal for Rovers in a 3–3 draw against with Rangers on 2 April. His next goal came in the Scottish Championship semi-final first leg play-off against Hibernian at Stark's Park on 4 May 2016; Rovers went on to lose 2–0 (2–1 on aggregate) in the return leg three days later. He was released by Leicester City at the end of the 2015–16 season.

Barrow
Panayiotou cut short a trial at Borussia Dortmund's under-23 team to sign a two-year contract with National League side Barrow in September 2016; "Bluebirds" manager Paul Cox said that "he had offers from Yeovil and Coventry and even from Salt Lake City in America, but he wanted to play here for us". He made his debut for Barrow in an FA Trophy replay against Harrogate Town on 13 December 2016. On 23 March 2017, he joined National League North side Salford City on loan until the end of the 2016–17 season. He played three games for the "Ammies".

Back with Barrow for the 2017–18 season he chose to turn down his country so as to help Adrian Pennock's side battle against relegation. The battle proved successful as Barrow finished one place and one point above the relegation zone.

Nuneaton Borough
On 25 June 2018, Panayiotou signed with National League North side Nuneaton Borough in a move that reunited him with former Leicester City youth coach Nicky Eaden. He made 20 appearances for "Boro" in the first half of the 2018–19 season, before he departed Liberty Way on 23 January 2019.

Aittitos Spata
In January 2019, Panayiotou signed for Greek Football League side Aittitos Spata. The "Invincible" were relegated at the end of the 2018–19 season after being expelled for financial problems.

Aldershot Town
On 12 July 2019, Panayiotou joined National League side Aldershot Town after a successful trial spell. He scored four goals in 30 appearances for the "Shots" in the 2019–20 season, which was permanently suspended on 26 March due to the COVID-19 pandemic in England, with Aldershot in 16th-place. He scored 12 goals from 37 appearances in the 2020–21 season, finishing as the "Shots" joint-top goalscorer.

Livingston 
On 12 August 2021, Panayiotou signed a two-year deal with an option for a third year with Scottish Premiership club Livingston. He made his debut at the Almondvale Stadium in the Scottish League Cup on 14 August, coming on as a 67th-minute substitute only to be substituted himself eleven minutes later in what ended as a 1–1 draw with St Mirren; manager David Martindale said after the game that it was a mistake to play Panayiotou as he was not fit. He made his Premiership debut in a 0–0 draw with Celtic on 30 October. He made just four substitute appearances in the league for the "Lions" and his contract was mutually terminated in January 2022. Panayiotou said there was a "toxic" environment at the club.

Return to Aldershot
On 5 January 2022, Panayiotou returned to Aldershot Town on a free transfer, signing an eighteen month deal. He said it was a "no-brainer" to return to the Recreation Ground and said manager Mark Molesley had "amazing" tactical awareness and knowledge. He scored one goal in fifteen appearances in the second half of the 2021–22 season. On 17 February 2023, Panayiotou joined league rivals Maidenhead United on a one-month loan.

International career
On 8 October 2014, Panayiotou scored on his debut for Saint Kitts and Nevis in their Caribbean Cup qualifying defeat to Barbados at Stade Sylvio Cator in Port-au-Prince, Haiti.

On 26 March 2015, he scored a hat-trick beginning with a penalty in the second leg of a World Cup first qualifying round tie against the Turks and Caicos Islands at the TCIFA National Academy in Providenciales; Saint Kitts and Nevis won the match 6–2 for a 12–4 aggregate victory. On 26 March 2016, he scored in a 2–0 win over Aruba which secured passage into the Second Round of qualification for the 2017 Caribbean Cup. This also meant he broke an 85-year Leicester City club record previously held by England's Ernie Hine – the Foxes' all-time leading goalscorer at international level.

Career statistics

Club

International

International goals
Scores and results list Saint Kitts and Nevis' goal tally first.

References

External links
 

1994 births
Living people
Association football forwards
English footballers
Saint Kitts and Nevis footballers
Saint Kitts and Nevis expatriate footballers
Saint Kitts and Nevis international footballers
English people of Greek Cypriot descent
English sportspeople of Saint Kitts and Nevis descent
Footballers from Leicester
English expatriate footballers
Expatriate footballers in Greece
English expatriate sportspeople in Greece
Saint Kitts and Nevis expatriate sportspeople in Greece
Leicester City F.C. players
Port Vale F.C. players
Raith Rovers F.C. players
Barrow A.F.C. players
Salford City F.C. players
Nuneaton Borough F.C. players
Aittitos Spata F.C. players
Aldershot Town F.C. players
Livingston F.C. players
Maidenhead United F.C. players
English Football League players
Scottish Professional Football League players
National League (English football) players
Football League (Greece) players